Nils "Nisse" Lennart Ericson (14 March 1906 – 6 April 1980) was a Swedish actor and singer. Ericson appeared in over 25 films between 1928 and 1972.

Selected filmography
 Gustaf Wasa (1928)
 For Her Sake (1930)
 Cavaliers of the Crown (1930)
 Swedenhielms (1935)
 Under False Flag (1935)
 Unfriendly Relations (1936)
 Conscientious Objector Adolf (1936)
 Hotel Paradise (1937)
 Sun Over Sweden (1938)
 Just a Bugler (1938)
 The Sin of Anna Lans (1943)
 Nyordning på Sjögårda (1944)
 Evening at the Djurgarden (1946)
 Sunshine (1948)
 Life at Forsbyholm Manor (1948)
 Min syster och jag (1950)
 Kronans glada gossar (1952)
 47:an Löken (1971)

References

External links

1906 births
1980 deaths
Swedish male film actors
20th-century Swedish male actors